= Ocean Nuclear =

- Native name: 海核能源
- Company type: Private company
- Industry: Finance and Energy
- Founded: 2017; 9 years ago
- Headquarters: Shenzhen, China
- Key people: Qiu Zhen, chairman
- Number of employees: 100

Ocean Nuclear (Chinese: 海核能源) is a financial services provider for the nuclear energy industry. It provides capital market services for energy projects worldwide and has negotiated nuclear infrastructure projects in more than 20 countries.

== Capital ==
Ocean Nuclear is currently raising US$5,000,000,000 to fund infrastructure projects in nuclear energy.

== Global Nuclear Investment Summit ==
Ocean Nuclear co-organises the Global Nuclear Investment Summit (GNIS). The first was held in Beijing in January 2018. The second took place in London in June 2018, in partnership with the Financial Times.
